NPO Nieuws was a 24-hour news channel operated by the NOS, the public broadcaster which supplies news and sports to all national public television and radio networks. NOS also provides programming for the political channel, NPO Politiek.

NPO Nieuws broadcasts all editions of the NOS Journaal news bulletin, and repeats the last news broadcast. NPO Nieuws also showed four extra programmes named NOS Journaal Chat, NOS Journaal Plus (extra information), NOS Journaal Reportages and NOS Journaal Weekoverzicht. A half-hourly version (15 minutes plus another 15 minute repeat) of the youth-oriented news programme NOS Jeugdjournaal also aired every day on NPO Nieuws. Until 16 September 2007 teletext news was also shown on NPO Nieuws; this was later replaced by a scrolling news ticker showing news headlines. At any point, the programming could have been interrupted for breaking news.

The main studio is in Hilversum. On 10 March 2014, Journaal 24 changed its name into NPO Nieuws. 

NPO Nieuws closed on 15 December 2021. Some of its programming moved to NPO Politiek which was renamed by NPO Politiek en Nieuws.

References

External links 

 Official Website NPO Nieuws

Defunct television channels in the Netherlands
Television channels and stations established in 2004
Television channels and stations disestablished in 2021